Coutard is a French surname. Notable people with the surname include:

Henri Coutard (1876–1950), French scientist and pioneer in radiation oncology. Also credited with establishing radiotherapy as a clinical discipline
Raoul Coutard (1924–2016), French cinematographer

French-language surnames